The Converge FiberXers are a professional basketball team owned by Converge ICT. The team competes in the Philippine Basketball Association (PBA). The franchise began after acquiring the former Alaska Aces franchise on March 23, 2022.

History 
On February 16, 2022, Alaska Milk Corporation (AMC) announced that the Alaska Aces will leave the PBA at the end of the 2021 Governors' Cup. This was due to a directive by FrieslandCampina, parent company of AMC.

Several companies expressed interest to buy the Aces or its franchise. The prospect company could retain the Alaska Aces team if they bought the franchise within the ongoing season. In the event the franchise is not sold within the ongoing season, the PBA would place the players in a dispersal draft.

On March 23, the PBA announced the sale of the Alaska Aces to Converge ICT. The sale was unanimously approved by the PBA Board of Governors. Smart Communications, the owner of TNT Tropang Giga and a business competitor of Converge, was noted for not blocking Converge's entry into the PBA. Former PBA commissioner Chito Salud will serve as the board governor of the new team. On April 2, the team announced that Jeffrey Cariaso, who was the last head coach of the former Aces team prior to the sale of the franchise, was retained as head coach.

On April 5, Converge ICT formally unveiled their team under the name Converge FiberXers. It was also announced that the assistant coaches of the former Alaska team were retained. Erstwhile Alaska Aces board governor and team manager Richard Bachmann will serve as the assistant team manager of the FiberXers.

In August 2022, Cariaso was released as the head coach of the team and was replaced by Aldin Ayo.

Roster

Season-by-season records 

Records from the 2022–23 PBA season:
*one-game playoffs**team had the twice-to-beat advantage

References

 
2022 establishments in the Philippines
Basketball teams established in 2022